Johann Georg Christian Lehmann (25 February 1792 – 12 February 1860) was a German botanist.

Born at Haselau, near Uetersen, Holstein, Lehmann studied medicine in Copenhagen and Göttingen, obtained a doctorate in medicine in 1813 and a doctorate in philosophy from the University of Jena in 1814. He spent the rest of his life as professor of physics and natural sciences, and head librarian, at the Gymnasium Academicum in Hamburg.

A prolific monographist of apparently quarrelsome character, he was a member of 26 learned societies and the founder of the Hamburg Botanical Garden (now the Alter Botanischer Garten Hamburg). Lehmann died at Hamburg in 1860.

Some of Lehmann's later illustrations were executed by the German entomologist Johann Wilhelm Meigen.

Publications
Generis Nicotiniarum Historia Hamburg 1818
Plantae e Familiae Asperifoliarum Nuciferae 1818
Monographia Generis Primularum Lipsiae 1819
Monographia Generis Potentillarum 1820 Supplement 1836
Semina in Horto Botanico Hamburgensi 1822-1840
Icones et Descriptiones Novarum et Minus Cognitarum Stirpium in 5 parts of 10 plates each 1: 1821 2: 1822 3: 1823 4: 1823 5: 1824
Novarum et Minus Cognitarum Stirpium Pugillus I-X Addita Enumeratione Plantarum Omnium in his Pugillus Descriptarum. Hamburgi 1828-1857
Delectus Seminum quae in Horto Hamburgensium Botanico e Collectioni Anni1830-1840; 1849–1852
Plantae Preissianae Hamburg 1844-1847
Index Seminum in Horto Botanico Hamburgensi A. 1851 Collectorum Hamburg 1851-1855
Revisionem Potentillarum 1856
Observationes zoologicae praesertim in faunam hamburgensem. Pugillus primus. Indicem scholarum publice privatimque in Hamburgensium Gymnasio Academico 1822

References

External links
https://upload.wikimedia.org/wikipedia/commons/5/56/Johann_Christian_Lehmann.jpg
Allg. Deutsche Biographie

1792 births
1860 deaths
People from Pinneberg (district)
People from the Duchy of Holstein
Botanists with author abbreviations
19th-century German botanists
German entomologists
University of Jena alumni
Corresponding members of the Saint Petersburg Academy of Sciences